Duvelleroy is a fan maker and leather goods manufacturer founded in Paris, France, in 1827 by Jean-Pierre Duvelleroy. It is one of the rare French fan makers still in existence today.

History

Founded in Paris, 1827 
For centuries, Paris had been the capital of haute couture, high-class jewelry, and fan-making, but in 1827 the city had no more than fifteen fan-makers. Yet it was at that precise moment that Jean-Pierre Duvelleroy chose to establish his own fan house in Paris. At 25 years old, he was convinced that this small accessory, which had gone out of fashion after the French Revolution, might become fashionable once again. The demand for fans in South America, which was at the time the primary export market for French fan makers, helped him to start his business.

A ball at the Tuileries, or how fans came back into fashion
Two years later, a special event was to bring him luck: a ball given by the Duchess of Berry at the Tuileries Palace in March 1829. For the quadrille the women sported fans. A single dance did it all: once again, fans were back.

A prestigious address, 15 rue de la Paix
The house opened a boutique at 15, rue de la Paix, while its ateliers were established at 17, passage des Panoramas in Paris. Duvelleroy chose the Place Vendome neighborhood at the right moment: it was undergoing major changes and would soon become the center of luxury wares and high-class jewelry.

Design and production: a pioneer’s work
To produce fan sticks and guards from precious wood, horn, mother of pearl, ivory or tortoise shell, Jean-Pierre Duvelleroy recruited the best stick makers (or ‘tabletiers’), who were traditionally based in the Oise region of France. For the leaves of his fans, he collaborated with the most sought-after engravers and painters, sometimes working with artists such as Ingres or Delacroix for exceptional pieces.

Duvelleroy and the Great Exhibitions: time for recognition
During twenty years, the founder of the House of Duvelleroy contributed to many fan related innovations and patents, never sparing his efforts to obtain recognition for the profession. In 1851, willing to defend his vision of the craft, he wrote a letter to Nathalis Rondot, who recorded the fan section at the 1851 Great Exhibition in London. That same year, Duvelleroy was awarded the prize medal at The Crystal Palace. From then on, the house would receive many gold medals for its craftsmanship. The Duvelleroys father and son would each be President of the Syndicate of Fan makers. On this account, both received the Légion d’Honneur, the Greatest Order of Merit for in France.

Duvelleroy, fan maker to the queens
After the production of a fan representing the Royal Family of England, based on a painting by Winterhalter, Duvelleroy was appointed supplier to Queen Victoria, and opened a boutique in London. Soon enough, Duvelleroy fans were sold in all major courts of Europe. In 1853, Duvelleroy realized a fan for the wedding of Eugénie de Montijo to Emperor Napoleon III. Later, the house would be nominated exclusive supplier of the City of Paris. As such, the House of Duvelleroy realized the fans given to the wives of foreign sovereigns and dignitaries coming to Paris for official visits, such as the Empress of Russia, the Queen of Sweden, the Queen of Denmark and the Queen of Bulgaria.

Little by little, couture fans became it-fans: the leaves of such fans were made of tulle, silk gauze, lace or organza and embroidered with sequins; new shapes were born, and feathers worked into marquetry created new motives.

The language of the fan by Duvelleroy
Jean-Pierre Duvelleroy gave the London House to his elder son Jules, born out of wedlock, while he handed over the management of the Paris House to his legitimate son, Georges Duvelleroy. For some time, Jules Duvelleroy developed the house in England, where he published the language of the fan, a whole code supposedly used by women for centuries. According to Duvelleroy leaflets:
 Twirling the fan in the left hand means "we are watched."
 Carrying the fan in the right hand in front of her face means "follow me."
 Covering the left ear with the open fan means "do not betray our secret."
 Drawing the fan through the hand means "I hate you."
 Drawing the fan across the cheek means "I love you."
 Touching the tip of the fan with the finger means "I wish to speak to you."
 Letting the fan rest on the right cheek means "yes."
 Letting the fan rest on the left cheek means "no."
 Opening and shutting the fan means "you are cruel."
 Dropping the fan means "we will be friends."
 Fanning slowly means "I am married."
 Fanning rapidly means "I am engaged."
 Touching the handle of the fan to the lips means "kiss me."

Duvelleroy, leather goods manufacturer
Since the origins of the House, Duvelleroy's evening bags, purses and clutches allow the clients to carry around their precious fans with style.

When the fans went out of fashion after World War II, Duvelleroy survived thanks to the beautifully crafted evening bags.

Duvelleroy and Art Nouveau
The Art Nouveau period was very rich stylistically for Duvelleroy. Fans were adorned with flowers and women, often painted by Billotey, Louise Abbema, or Maurice Leloir.
Two icons of the House were born at that period: the “ballon” or Fontange fan, with its rounded shape, and the Duvelleroy daisy trademark stamped on each fan rivet.

Advertising fans in the 1920s
After World War I, the production of fashion fans with textile leaves, declined in favour of advertising fans, with paper leaves. Duvelleroy worked with artists such as Paul Iribe (known for his sketch of a mother and her daughter, which became Lanvin’s trademark) and engraver, offering fans as an advertising media for fragrances, high-end hotels and couture houses. Duvelleroy had its advertising fans printed by Maison Maquet.
Between the two wars, Duvelleroy couture fans were mainly feathered fans, often made of ostrich, to adorn the ladies of the Roaring Twenties.
Georges Duvelleroy passed on his know-how to Madeleine Boisset, painter and fan maker, while his daughter took over the direction of the company.

1940-1981: the survival of the House of Duvelleroy
In 1940, Jules-Charles Maignan, who used to work at the Parisian department store Galeries Lafayette, took over the House of Duvelleroy from the great-grandchildren of the founder. Madeleine Boisset, a lifelong apprentice of Georges Duvelleroy, ensured for some time the continuity of know-how. Until a tragedy befell:  her affiliation to the Resistance movement in France was discovered, and she was deported to the Ravensbruck camp. She died in 1945. It is with her that young Michel Maignan, today’s inheritor of the House, discovered the world of fans.

Duvelleroy is one of the only Houses of fans to have survived after World War II. Little by little, fans left women’s hands to become a collector’s privilege.
After the war, Duvelleroy continued existing thanks to the trade of small leather goods and pouches, as well as by selling and restoring antique fans.

1981-2009: the saving of a heritage
By duty of memory, Michel Maignan conserved the Duvelleroy Fund which his grandfather passed on to him in 1981. This Fund is made of fans, drawings, tools, materials and furnishings kept since the foundation of the House of Duvelleroy in 1827. “I give it to you so that you can make something out of it”, he said. In 1986, an exhibit dedicated to the Fan as a mirror of the Belle Époque was given in Paris: many Duvelleroy fans were exhibited on this occasion. Since then, many publications and exhibits have been developed, referring to Duvelleroy. In 1995, an exhibit in England was entirely dedicated to the House: Duvelleroy, King of Fans, Fanmaker to Kings.

2010: a renewed creativity
In 2010, two young women from the luxury and fashion industry became partners with Michel Maignan, in order to redevelop the House of Duvelleroy through the creation of high-end fans.

See also

Fan (implement)

Bibliography
 "Fan", The Grove Encyclopedia of Decorative Arts, Edited by Gordon Campbell, Oxford University Press, 2006 
 Lucie Saboudjian, Ph. John Keyser, Ils collectionnent…Les Eventails, Trouvailles, N°43, Novembre / Décembre 1983 (M2791-43)
 Musée de la Mode et du Costume, L’Eventail, Miroir de la Belle Epoque, Ville de Paris, 15 May 1985 
 Michel Maignan, “L’éventail, De l’attribut sacré à l’accessoire de séduction”, Demeures & Châteaux, N°36, Juillet/Août/Septembre 1986 (M1512-36)
 Christl Kammerl, Der Fächer, Kunstobjekt und Billetdoux, Hirmer Verlag München,  Münich, 1990 
 The Fan Museum, Duvelleroy — King of Fans, Fanmaker to Kings, catalogue de l’exposition du 3 October 95 au 21 January 96 au Fan Museum Greenwich, Londres, 1995
 Hélène Alexander, Fans, Shire Publications Ltd., Buckinghamshire, 2002 
 Hélène Alexander, Russel Harris, Presenting a Cooling Image, Photography by the Lafayette Studio of Bond Street and Fans from The Fan Museum Greenwich, The Fan Museum, Greenwich, Londres, 2007 
 Fabienne Falluel, Marie-Laure Gutton, Élégance et Système D, Paris 1940-1944, Paris Musées, Les Collections de la Ville de Paris, mars 2009, Actes Sud 
 Charles Knight, The English cyclopaedia, Volume 4, Page 23, 1867
 Jules Kindt, Rapport de la Commission Belge de l’Exposition Universelle de Paris en 1867, tome II, pages 327-8, Bruxelles, Imprimerie Et Lithographie de E. Guyot, 1868

References

External links
 www.duvelleroy.fr

French companies established in 1827
Fashion accessory companies
Clothing brands
High fashion brands
Art Nouveau
Companies based in Paris